Lozen Saddle (Lozenska Sedlovina \'lo-zen-ska se-dlo-vi-'na\) is a 437 m high saddle situated between Lozen Nunatak and Zograf Peak in Tangra Mountains, eastern Livingston Island in the South Shetland Islands, Antarctica which provides overland access from the Wörner Gap area to the Shipka Valley.  The saddle was first crossed by the Bulgarian Lyubomir Ivanov from Camp Academia on 17 December 2004, and takes its name from the adjacent Lozen Nunatak.

Location

Maps
 L.L. Ivanov et al. Antarctica: Livingston Island and Greenwich Island, South Shetland Islands. Scale 1:100000 topographic map. Sofia: Antarctic Place-names Commission of Bulgaria, 2005.
 L.L. Ivanov. Antarctica: Livingston Island and Greenwich, Robert, Snow and Smith Islands. Scale 1:120000 topographic map.  Troyan: Manfred Wörner Foundation, 2009.

References
 Lozen Saddle. SCAR Composite Antarctic Gazetteer
 Bulgarian Antarctic Gazetteer. Antarctic Place-names Commission. (details in Bulgarian, basic data in English)

External links
 Lozen Saddle. Copernix satellite image

Mountain passes of Livingston Island